Frank Dominic Carpin (born September 14, 1938) is an American former professional baseball pitcher, who played in Major League Baseball (MLB) for the Pittsburgh Pirates and Houston Astros.  Before 1959 season, Carpin was signed by the New York Yankees as an amateur free agent. On November 30, 1964, he was drafted by the Pittsburgh Pirates from the New York Yankees in the 1964 minor league draft. A year later, on November 29, 1965, he was drafted by the Houston Astros from the Pittsburgh Pirates in the 1965 rule 5 draft.

References

External links

1938 births
Living people
Major League Baseball pitchers
Notre Dame Fighting Irish baseball players
Pittsburgh Pirates players
Houston Astros players
Columbus Jets players
Lynchburg White Sox players
Augusta Yankees players
Amarillo Gold Sox players
Oklahoma City 89ers players
Richmond Virginians (minor league) players
Binghamton Triplets players
Greensboro Yankees players
Sportspeople from Brooklyn
Baseball players from New York City